Wu Song, also known as Second Brother Wu, is a legendary hero recounted since the 13th century; and one of the well-known fictional characters in the Water Margin, one of the Four Great Classic Novels in Chinese literature.

Nicknamed "Pilgrim", he ranks 14th among the 36 Heavenly Spirits of the 108 Heroes.  In folk tales derived from the novel, Wu Song is a martial arts student of Zhou Tong and specialises in Chuojiao. In the novel he fights well with bang (quarterstaff) or a pair of broadswords.

Attestations 
Legends surrounding the heroic figure of Wu Song have existed since the late Song Dynasty. A passing mention of a story about Pilgrim Wu occurs in the 13th century author Luo Ye's collection Stories Told By An Old Drunkard. The earliest record of a tale in which Wu Song fights a tiger comes from a zaju play written by a late 13th century writer who wrote under the pen name "Red-Tattooed Second Li", but the play itself is no longer extant. The oldest surviving Chinese drama version of the tiger-slaying episode is the chuanqi or "miraculous" play by Shen Jing (1553-1610) dating to the late 16th century, and the earliest editions of the Water Margin that contain the tiger episode also date around the end of the 16th century.

Background 

A native of Qinghe County (in present-day Xingtai, Hebei), Wu Song is tall and good-looking with shining eyes, thick eyebrows, a muscular build and an impressive bearing. His parents having died early, he was raised by his dwarfish elder brother Wu Dalang (武大郎; literally "Wu the Older"), whom he respects and cares very much about. Wu Song's nickname Wu Erlang is reference to him being the secondborn son.

Water Margin 
Wu Song knocks a man unconscious at his hometown after getting into a fight when drunk. He flees, thinking that the man has died. When taking shelter in the residence of the nobleman Chai Jin, he meets Song Jiang, who is also fleeing the law after killing his mistress Yan Poxi. They become sworn brothers.

Slaying the tiger 

Learning later that the man he hit is not dead, Wu Song decides to return home.  On the way, he passes by an inn near Jingyang Ridge, which puts out a banner that reads "After Three Bowls, Do Not Cross the Ridge", and goes in for a break. The innkeeper explains that the inn's home-brewed wine is so strong that customers would get drunk after having three bowls and could not cross the ridge ahead. Still sober after three bowls, Wu Song demands more. By the end of his meal, he has consumed 18 bowls of wine but still looks steady.  He is about to leave when the innkeeper stops him and warns him about a fierce tiger on the ridge. Wu Song suspects that the man is hoaxing him to spend the night at his inn. Ignoring the advice, he continues his journey, armed with only a quarterstaff.

Near the ridge, Wu Song spots an official notice warning of a tiger ahead. Not to lose face, he could not turn back. As he moves on, he starts to feel the effect of the wine. So he takes a nap on a big rock.  As he is falling asleep, the tiger leaps out from the woods, shocking him out of his stupour.  After narrowly dodging the tiger‘s first three charges, Wu Song attempts to fight back but breaks his staff on a tree.  Unarmed, he summons all his might and manages to pin the tiger face down with his arms. He then rains blows on its head using his bare fist. After punching the tiger unconscious, he picks up his broken staff and whacks the tiger till he is sure it is dead. Exhausted and fearing another tiger might appear, he then flees the spot after a short rest, and runs into some local hunters, who are amazed to learn of his incredible feat. Impressed, the local magistrate of the nearby Yanggu County (in present-day Liaocheng, Shandong) offers him the job of chief constable. Wu Song accepts it and settles down, and surprisingly runs into his long-separated brother Wu Dalang, who has also moved to Yanggu from Qinghe.

According to some narrations in Yangzhou storytelling, particularly the "Wang school", Wu Song's slaying of the tiger took place "in the middle of the tenth (lunar) month" of the "Xuanhe year [1119]".

Avenging his brother 

Wu Dalang brings Wu Song home and introduces him to his wife Pan Jinlian.  Wu Song learns that they had moved to Yanggu to avoid harassments by neighbours in Qinghe.  Wu Dalang, who is a dwarf selling flatbread for a living, is widely taunted in Qinghe as "Three-Inch Nail Tree Bark" for his short stature.  The harassment got worse after he married Pan, as he looks starkly incompatible with his young and attractive wife, who was originally a maid of a rich man and had been forced to marry Wu Dalang as punishment for resisting her boss' advances.  Meeting Wu Song, Pan is immediately attracted to her handsome and well-built brother-in-law, but he sternly spurns her attempt to seduce him.

Later, Wu Song is assigned to escort some gold to the imperial capital Dongjing (present-day Kaifeng, Henan).  He returns home two months later to find his brother had died and his body had been cremated. Not believing his sister-in-law's account that his brother succumbed to a sudden illness, he conducts a private investigation. He learns that Pan is having an affair with a local merchant Ximen Qing, a well-off scoundrel who has seduced the woman with the help of the tea house owner Granny Wang, who lives next door to the Wus. Tipped by a bun-selling youth Brother Yun, Wu Dalang had caught Ximen and Pan in bed together. But he was left injured and bedridden after being kicked hard in the abdomen by Ximen. Abetted by Granny Wang and Ximen, Pan murdered him by poisoning his medicine. Ximen then coerced a coroner to quickly cremate the body. Wu Song finds the coroner, who has kept some remains of Wu Dalang which show signs of poisoning.  Wu Song then goes to the magistrate to demand legal justice. However, the magistrate, who has been bribed by Ximen, dismisses the case on grounds of insufficient evidence.

Denied legal avenue, Wu Song takes the matter into his own hands.  He invites neighbours of the Wu house, including Granny Wang, to a belated wake for his brother. At the wake, he forces Pan Jinlian at knife point to make a full confession on the murder, and then decapitates and disembowels her in vengeance.  Next he makes Granny Wang sign a confession in front of the neighbours.  After that, he rushes to Lion Restaurant, where Ximen Qing is dining with his friends, and kills the man after a brief fight.  Wu then goes to the county office to surrender himself.

Becoming an outlaw 

The local residents sympathise with Wu Song and plead on his behalf. Granny Wang is sentenced to death by lingchi while Wu Song is exiled to  Mengzhou.  On the way Wu and his two escorts pass by Cross Slope (十字坡; in present-day Fan County, Henan), where they take a rest in Sun Erniang's inn.  Wu senses the woman is up to no good and pretends to have taken her drugged wine and fall unconscious.  When Sun tries to lift him, he easily overpowers her.  Just then, Sun's husband Zhang Qing comes back and stops the scuffle. The couple apologise and befriend Wu. They host him for some time before seeing him off to Mengzhou.

Shi En (施恩), the son of the superintendent of Mengzhou prison, has heard of Wu Song's exploits and hopes he could help him re-take control of Happy Forest (快活林), a bustling cross-roads. In fact most of Shi's "profit" is protection money from businesses and tolls from travelers which he collected through a restaurant at that location. But the restaurant has been snatched from Shi by one Jiang Zhong (蔣忠), a burly wrestler nicknamed "Jiang the Door God". Invited to Mengzhou by his relative militia instructor Zhang (張團練), Jiang beat up Shi En and seized control of Happy Forest. Shi, needing Wu Song‘s help, tells his father to spare him mandatory beating which newly-arrived exiles are subject to and ensures he leads a comfortable life in prison. Wu initially thinks all this is just a run-up to murdering him in prison as he has refused to bribe the officials to escape the beating. Upon knowing the real reason, Wu agrees to help Shi take back the restaurant. But Shi doubts he has recovered his strength after days of ordeal. Wu demonstrates his physical might by lifting with one hand a hefty urn. He also says his fighting ability is at its peak when he is drunk. So he asks to be served three bowls of wine at every inn he comes by on his way to Happy Forest. By the time he reaches the restaurant he has taken an enormous amount of wine.  He provokes Jiang Zhong into a fight and soundly beats him with a set of martial arts moves known as "Jade Circle Steps and Mandarin Ducks Kicks" (玉環步，鴛鴦腳).  Jiang is ordered to apologise to Shi En, return Happy Forest to him and leave Mengzhou for good.

Humiliated, Jiang Zhong collaborates with Instructor Zhang and garrison inspector Zhang Mengfang to get back at Wu Song.  Inspector Zhang pretends to admire Wu Song for his mighty strength and invites him to stay at his manor. Wu is caught in an ambush and sent to prison on the false charge of theft. After being  jailed for six months, during which Shi En thwarts a plot to murder him in prison, Wu is exiled to another place. Shi En warns him of danger when sending him off. Indeed Jiang Zhong has bribed Wu‘s escorts to murder him on the way with the help of two of his students. When the group come to Flying Cloud Pool, Wu breaks up his cangue and kills all the four men. He returns to Inspector Zhang's manor and finds his way to the Mandarin Ducks Tower, where the trio — Jiang and the two Zhangs  — are drinking in celebration of his certain death.  He kills all three and practically the whole family of Inspector Zhang. Overall 15 are killed in Zhang's house. He then writes the characters "The killer is Wu Song the tiger-slayer" with blood on a wall before leaving.

After fleeing Mengzhou, Wu Song runs into Sun Erniang and Zhang Qing again, who advise him to go to Mount Twin Dragons to join the outlaw band there. Sun suggests that he disguise as an untonsured Buddhist pilgrim to avoid being recognised since his wanted notice bearing his portrait is posted everywhere.  Earlier on, Sun had butchered a Buddish pilgrim, who left behind a Buddhist robe, a necklace of skulls, a headband and a pair of broadswords.  Wu Song puts on the robe and lets down his hair, as Buddhist pilgrims do, thus concealing the exile tattoo on his face. He is thenceforth nicknamed "Pilgrim".

On his way, Wu Song passes by a temple where a Taoist Wang, nicknamed "Flying Centipede", keeps a kidnapped woman for sexual pleasure.  Wu Song kills the priest and his servants, saves the woman, and burns down the temple.  Next he comes by an inn and gets into a fight with Kong Liang as the latter is served food more palatable than his. He does not accept the explanation from the innkeeper that Kong has supplied his own ingredients. Kong is beaten up badly. Later, with the help of his brother Kong Ming and their men, Kong Liang tracks down Wu Song, who has got so drunk that he falls unconscious at a creek. They overpower him easily, tie him to a tree and beat him up.  Song Jiang, who is living at the Kongs‘ manor at that time, recognises Wu, and asks the brothers to release him. Wu Song reaches Mount Twin Dragons where he joins Lu Zhishen and Yang Zhi.

After his defeat by the bandits of Liangshan Marsh, the imperial general Huyan Zhuo flees to Qingzhou (in present-day Shandong) in hope of redeeming himself by wiping out the bandits there. One of the strongholds is Mount Twin Dragons, which, finding Huyan a tough opponent, requests help from Liangshan. Song Jiang, Liangshan's then second-in-command, comes to Qingzhou with a force and captures Huyan. The bandits of Mount Twin Dragons, including Wu Song, are absorbed into Liangshan.

Campaigns and retirement 
Wu Song is appointed as one of the leaders of the Liangshan infantry after the 108 Heroes came together in what is called the Grand Assembly. He is one of the few who vehemently object to seeking amnesty from the emperor and becoming servants of the Song government. Nevertheless, he participates in the campaigns against the invading Liao army and rebel forces in Song territory following amnesty from Emperor Huizong for Liangshan.

In the battle of Muzhou (睦州; in present-day Hangzhou, Zhejiang) in the campaign against the rebel leader Fang La, Wu Song fights Fang‘s sorcerer Bao Daoyi. Using his magic power, Bao manoeuvres a flying sword to slice off Wu Song's left arm. Wu is saved by Lu Zhishen.  Wu is one of the few Liangshan heroes who survive the run of campaigns. Not wanting to serve the government, he refuses to go back to Dongjing and chooses to stay in Hangzhou to look after the stroke-stricken Lin Chong.  He lives as a Buddhist recluse in the Liuhe Pagoda until the age of 80.

Jin Ping Mei 

The beginning of Jin Ping Mei is roughly the same as Water Margin.  After his sister-in-law murders his brother, he wants to take revenge.  First, he tries to kill Ximen Qing, his sister-in-law's lover, but he kills the wrong person instead and is exiled to Mengzhou. He comes back later, and learns that Ximen Qing has died after an illness. He then kills his sister-in-law and flees to Mount Twin Dragons.

Jin Ping Mei is famous for its sexually explicit content, but there is nothing similar in the story of Wu Song in Water Margin.

Zhou Tong's apprentice 
The following tale alternatively known as "Meeting Zhou Tong By Chance" and "Swordplay under the Moon" belongs to the "Wang School Shuihu" of Yangzhou storytelling. It acts as a spin-off story, which means it takes place in the same setting as Water Margin, but is independent of the main story line. The tale takes place after Wu Song kills the man-eating tiger, resists the charms of his sister-in-law and accepts a mission from the magistrate to transport money to Kaifeng, but before he becomes a bandit. It explains how he came to learn swordplay from Zhou Tong:

Wu Song was given orders to travel on assignment to Kaifeng after becoming a constable in Yanggu County. When he arrived in Kaifeng, Wu Song took his introduction letter to the yamen and retired to an inn to await his summons. The following day, he left his inn to explore the bustling city.

Kaifeng was one of the largest cities in China at that time and it was full of various kinds of shops and heavy traffic from people coming in and leaving the city. As Wu Song walked along enjoying the organised chaos, the sky changed colour and it became a torrential downpour. It rained so much that waves flowed across the ground and mist rose around the houses. The rain hurt the top of his head so he huddled under the roof of a small shop along with several other people vying for safety. However, as soon as it started, the rain suddenly stopped.

Wu Song continued on his way when he came to the Tianhan Bridge. It was arched, so people had to use steps to ascend to the top. When he stepped onto the bridge, Wu Song lifted up his clothing and looked down at his feet so he could avoid the huge puddles of water left from the freak rain shower. Unbeknownst to him, he was walking directly towards an elderly man who was descending the stairs right above him. Wu Song continued to walk up the bridge without looking in front of him. This old man was Zhou Tong and he was in a hurry. When Zhou Tong saw Wu Song approaching him on the bridge without watching in front of him, he took Wu Song to be another martial arts master who wished to tarnish his reputation by throwing him off the bridge with a shoulder strike. Zhou Tong prepared for a counterattack and began to swallow air with a subtle "Hm!" and directed his energy to his right shoulder, which turned red then purple and became as hard as rock underneath his clothing. When the two men brushed shoulders, despite being a master of Iron Shirt and Drunken Eight Immortals boxing, Wu Song was nearly knocked off the bridge and the pain caused saliva to pour from his mouth. The attack left him weak in the knees and one side of his body was completely numb. He thought after all of his years of martial arts practice his body was nearly invincible, but he had met his superior in Zhou Tong. Instead of cursing and reprimanding the old man, Wu Song held his tongue, which greatly impressed Zhou Tong. In lieu of a kind word, Zhou Tong simply bowed in apology and went on his way since he was in a rush.

After Zhou Tong disappeared into the bustling crowd, Wu Song rubbed his shoulder and returned to his inn. He ate his lunch and supper in turn, but felt it was too early to go to bed. He went outside into a quiet courtyard behind the inn to do a little shadowboxing underneath the starry night sky. He untied his belt and wrenched it to the left and right until it was very tight and tied it into a knot. He then focused his energy and began to practise his Drunken Eight Immortals boxing. Before he was even half way done with his routine, the loud screams of another person's martial arts practice interrupted his concentration. He grabbed a bench to steady himself on and looked over the top of a brick wall that opened into the hall of a large mansion to the east of the inn.

In the middle of the hall sat three tables laden with all the myriad kinds of food. However, the stately-looking people attending this sumptuous feast were underneath the eaves of the hall watching a person practise his swordplay in the manor's courtyard. This person was Zhou Tong and he had his beard tied into a knot so he would not accidentally cut it off with his double swords. Zhou wielded his swords to and fro and did it so fast that the flashes of light cast from the blades made it look like his entire body was wrapped in snow. Even if a person threw a bowlful of ink at him, not a single drop of it would tarnish his clothing. Wu Song became mesmerised by Zhou Tong's display of superior swordsmanship. When he twirled around and ended up facing in his direction, Wu Song recognised Zhou Tong as the old man he had bumped into on the bridge earlier in the day. He realised that Zhou Tong must be a great master adept in the art of the "deep breath" technique.

During his practice, Zhou Tong let out a mountain-crumbling scream and fell onto his back while kicking one leg into the air. Wu Song felt sorry for Zhou Tong because he thought maybe the man was too old to practise the martial arts and had lost his balance. However, Zhou Tong screamed once more and this time he shot high into the sky with his swords pointed upward towards the moon. After watching him land and perform a few punches and kicks, it finally dawned on Wu Song that Zhou Tong was indeed practising the boxing routines of the immortals Iron-Crutch Li and Han Xiang from the Drunken Eight Immortals style. Zhou Tong was so good at this style that his performance once caused a fellow warrior to become intoxicated. Puzzled, Wu Song remembered back to his own martial arts master who had told him there were only two people in the world (including Wu Song and his master) who could perform such boxing. Zhou Tong also knew the style too. Because Zhou Tong's performance was so great, Wu Song went against the rules of etiquette and shouted praise from the top of the wall.

This shouting interrupted Zhou Tong before he could finish the forms for the rest of the Eight Immortals. He spun around and asked his aristocratic audience who it was that was shouting praise of his performance. They were unable to answer because their snobbery prevented them from noticing anything outside of their own amusement. However, one of their level-headed servants heard the noise and pointed towards the brick wall. Zhou Tong used his magical X-ray eyes to peer through the brick wall and into Wu Song's bone structure to see he was a special person indeed. When Wu Song praised Zhou Tong's performance, he formed an instant friendship with the old man. Zhou Tong invited Wu Song over the wall to partake in the festivities.

When Zhou Tong asked for his name, he was delighted to learn Wu Song was the same fellow who became famous for killing a man-eating tiger with his bare hands on Jingyang Ridge in Shandong in the previous year. When Wu Song learnt who Zhou Tong was, he immediately dropped to his knees, kowtowed and pleaded to become his apprentice. Wu Song was thrilled to meet this "master of the older generation", who was famous throughout the jianghu for his skill in military and civilian martial arts. Zhou Tong helped Wu Song up and began to teach him swordplay under the moon.

In other media 

Notable actors who have portrayed Wu Song in film and television include: Ti Lung, in The Water Margin (1972), Delightful Forest (1972) and Tiger Killer (1982); Zhu Yanping, in Outlaws of the Marsh (1983); Ding Haifeng, in The Water Margin (1998); Chen Long, in All Men Are Brothers (2011).

The Hong Kong comic Old Master Q also has a special edition animated cartoon with Water Margin characters, with the primary focus being on Wu Song. However, this version is extensively modified and presents a skewed version of Wu Song and the original story.

See also 

  for a list of supporting minor characters from Wu Song's story.
 Lāčplēsis

Notes

References

Citations

Sources 

 

 

 

 

 

 

 
 

36 Heavenly Spirits
Fictional police officers
Fictional mass murderers
Fictional characters from Hebei
Fictional amputees
Fictional Buddhist monks